Members of the New South Wales Legislative Council who served in the 50th Parliament were affected by the 1991 referendum which reduced the number of members and reduced their term from three terms of the Legislative Assembly to two terms, meaning the maximum term was eight years. The Council consisted of 42 members, 12 elected in 1984, 15 elected in 1988 and 15 elected in 1991. Half of the council would face re-election in 1995 and half did not face re-election until 1999. The President was Johno Johnson until 3 July 1991 and then Max Willis.

References

Members of New South Wales parliaments by term
20th-century Australian politicians